The Music I Like to Play Vol. 3, subtitled Let's Call This, is a solo album by pianist Tete Montoliu performing compositions associated with Thelonious Monk recorded in 1990 and released on the Italian Soul Note label.

Reception

Ken Dryden of AllMusic states, "Montoliu's approach to the keyboard is hardly a slavish adaptation of Monk's style, though there are some obvious influences, and as liner note writer Art Lange points out, he owes a debt to Bud Powell as well. He opens the CD with an uncredited chorus or so of the elegantly played "Jackie-Ing" before launching into overdrive for "Straight, No Chaser"; likewise, his daredevil approach to the furiously played "Well, You Needn't" is a treat. His disguised introduction to "Let's Call This" plays with the listener's ears, and he plays a modified form of stride in "Blues Five Spot." He also stretches the boundaries of the two standards "Sweet and Lovely" and "April in Paris" in a playful way worthy of Monk. It's a pity that Montoliu only recorded one more studio session as a leader following this productive date, but all of the late blind pianist's releases from his final years are well worth acquiring".

Track listing
All compositions by Thelonious Monk except where noted.
 "Straight, No Chaser" – 4:56
 "Reflections" – 7:02
 "In Walked Bud" – 3:31
 "Misterioso" – 4:32
 "Well, You Needn't" – 3:31
 "April in Paris" (Vernon Duke, Yip Harburg) – 4:38
 "Let's Call This" – 3:58
 "Sweet and Lovely" (Gus Arnheim, Jules LeMare, Harry Tobias) – 5:01
 "Blues Five Spot" – 3:27
 "Monk's Mood" – 3:54
 "Rhythm-a-Ning" – 2:44

Personnel
Tete Montoliu – piano

References

Tete Montoliu albums
1991 albums
Black Saint/Soul Note albums
Thelonious Monk tribute albums
Solo piano jazz albums